Darijan (also Romanized as Darījān) is a village in Howmeh Rural District, in the Central District of Bam County, Kerman Province, Iran. At the 2006 census, its population was 406, in 116 families.

References 

Populated places in Bam County